Spinal enthesopathy is a form of enthesopathy affecting the spine.

References

External links 

Musculoskeletal disorders